Igor Feoktisov (31 July 1928 – 2013) was a Soviet sprint canoeist who competed in the early 1950s. He finished tenth in the K-2 10000 m event at the 1952 Summer Olympics in Helsinki.

References
Igor Feoktisov's profile at Sports Reference.com
Mention of Igor Feoktisov's death 

1928 births
2013 deaths
Canoeists at the 1952 Summer Olympics
Olympic canoeists of the Soviet Union
Soviet male canoeists
Russian male canoeists